Ernestville is an unincorporated community in Lafayette County, in the U.S. state of Missouri.

The community was named after Ernest Worm, a local merchant. A post office was built in 1896 and remained in operation until 2005. The town was a popular trading outpost for illicit items before the great flood of 2005 destroyed much of the town.

References

Unincorporated communities in Lafayette County, Missouri
Unincorporated communities in Missouri